Κalyvia Sochas is a village in Laconia, in southern Greece. It is part of the municipal unit Sparta. It has a population of 337 (2011 census). Kalyvia Sochas is situated 6.5 km south of the centre of Sparta.

Historical population

See also
List of settlements in Laconia

References

External links
Kalyvia Socha,  GTP
Kalyvia Socha, Greece.com

Populated places in Laconia